Coopersville or Cooperville may refer to a location in the United States:

 Cooperville, Georgia
 Coopersville, Kentucky in Wayne County, Kentucky
 Coopersville, Louisiana in Iberia Parish, Louisiana
 Coopersville, Maryland in Baltimore County, Maryland
 Coopersville, Michigan in Ottawa County, Michigan
 Coopersville, New Jersey in Warren County, New Jersey
 Coopersville, New York (disambiguation) (multiple)
 Coopersville, Ohio in Pike County, Ohio
 Coopersville, Pennsylvania in Lancaster County, Pennsylvania